Jean-Michel Le Gal is a Canadian stage, television and film actor.

Early life
Le Gal was born in Toronto, Ontario to a francophone stage actress and television/music producer. He began acting at 10, opposite a squirrel puppet in the twelve-part television kids series Pri-Maths for TVOntario. In high school, he toured many schools in the Outaouais region with the community troupe Théâtre des Lueurs. Jean-Michel then participated in a seven-month cultural exchange with Canada World Youth between British Columbia and Sulawesi in Indonesia.

Acting Biography
After three years of professional theatre training at Studio 58 in Vancouver, Le Gal was invited to the Birmingham Conservatory for Classical Theatre Training at the Stratford Festival.

His first role at Stratford was in the 2004 production of Noises Off, directed by Brian Bedford, and his performance was positively reviewed by Kamal Al-Solaylee of the Globe and Mail.
He then went on to play numerous roles over four seasons including: Ferdinand in the Tempest opposite William Hutt, Silvius in As You Like It and Lorenzo in Merchant of Venice. He also received Stratford's John Hirsch Award for most promising actor.

In Montreal, he played Pierrot and La Violette in Dom Juan de Molière at the Théâtre du Nouveau Monde with Benoît Brière and James Hyndman, directed by Lorraine Pintal. Le Gal played Horace in École des femmes by Molière at the Théâtre français de Toronto, receiving a positive review from Stage Door.

In 2009, Le Gal attended the inaugural Actor's Conservatory at the Canadian Film Centre where he trained with Kiefer Sutherland, Sarah Polley and Norman Jewison.

Writing and Directing
Since 2004, Jean-Michel has written and directed three short films shot in Argentina, British Columbia and the Black Forest in Germany. Also, with director John Stead [archive], he wrote and produced the pilot episode of the comic series The Bobby Buck Show.

Creator and mental health advocate 

Inspired by comparative mythology and nature Jean-Michel's theatre-based creations aim to combat the harmful effects of technology and strengthen young hearts and minds.

In 2017, Jean-Michel co-founded ArtiCulture https://articulture.ca/, a non-profit corporation of professional artists passionate about connecting people, young and old, to farms and wilderness through the arts. As a Member of the Board and Artist Circle he has co-created cultural events in rural settings in partnership with the MRC and Tourisme Outaouais.

In 2010, Jean-Michel co-founded the theatre school at Théâtre français de Toronto. As artistic director, he created over 850 hours of workshops, 55 collective presentations for families, co-created and led a yearly summer camp with l’Alliance française de Toronto and a theatre club at Lycée Français Toronto, as well as directed seven musicals for kids performed on professional stages, before his departure in 2021.

Jean-Michel Le Gal has been passionately working in artistic education since 2002. During this time he has created and led over 1200 hours of contemporary and classical theatre workshops in both official languages for the Stratford Festival, University of Toronto, Canadian Film Centre, Ontario Arts Council and other of Canada's leading artistic institutions.

Film Credits 
 The Invisibles, Principal, Dir. Andrew Currie, 
 1Up, Supporting, Dir. Kyle Newman, Buzzfeed/Lionsgate
 French Exit, Principal, Dir. Azazel Jacobs, Elevation Pictures
 The Knight Before Christmas, Supporting, Dir. Monika Mitchell / Netflix
 State Like Sleep, Principal, Dir. Meredith Danluck / Scynthia Films
 She Sings for Me, Lead, Dir. Rebecca Davey, Official Selection, Not Short On Talent, Telefilm, Festival de Cannes, 2015
 BENJAMIN, Lead,  Dir. Sherren Lee, Official Selection, Short Cuts, Toronto International Film Festival, 2015
 WHAT WE HAVE, Supporting Lead, Dir. Maxime Desmons, Best Canadian Feature, Toronto Inside Out Film Festival, 2015
 FOXFIRE, Principal, Dir. Laurent Cantet, Official Selection, Toronto International Film Festival, 2012
 TONY GITONE Principal, Dir. Jerry Ciccoritti/Breakthrough Ent.   
 Take This Waltz, Principal, Dir. Sarah Polley,        Official Selection, Toronto International Film Festival, 2011
 JOHN A, Supporting, Dir. Jerry Ciccoritti/CBC
 THE HEART, Lead, Dir. Sarah Polley/BravoFact/CTV

Television Credits 
 PARIS PARIS, Dominic Desjardins / TV5
 ACCUSED, Dir. Marlee Matlin / Sony Pictures TV
 EAUX TURBULANTES, Lead, Dir. Lyne Charlebois / CBC
 HUDSON & REX, Dir. John Vatcher / CityTV
 GOOD WITCH, Dir. Steve DiMarco / Hallmark
 CONDOR, Recurring, Dir. Various / MGM / Skydance
 FRONTIER, Recurring, Dir. Various / Discovery / Netflix 
 MEHDI & VAL, Series Regular, Dir. Martin Cadotte / CBC
 MURDOCH MYSTERIES, Principal, Dir. Don McCutcheon / CBC
 REIGN,  Recurring Principal, Dir. Megan Follows / CBS / CW
 TOI & MOI, Recurring, Dir. Martin Cadotte / CBC
 Max & Shred, Series Regular,    Dir. Various / Nickelodeon / YTV
 ROOKIE BLUE, Principal, Dir. Paul Fox / ABC / Global
 Orphan Black, Principal, Dir. John Fawcett / BBC America / Space
 TRANSPORTER, Principal, Dir. Brad Turner / HBO
 LES BLEUS DE RAMVILLE, Recurring, Dir. Derek Dorio / TFO
 FLASHPOINT, Principal, Dir. Stefan Pleszczynski / CTV / CBS
 MAYDAY, Recurring, Dir. Ian Robertson / Cineflix
 METEO +, Principal, Dir. Derek Dorio / TFO

Stratford Festival Credits 
 Merchant of Venice, Lorenzo, dir. Richard Rose
 Comedy of Errors, Angelo, dir. Richard Monette
 An Ideal Husband, Mr.Montford, dir. Richard Monette
 Don Juan, Marigold, dir. Lorraine Pintal
 London Assurance, Martin, dir. Brian Bedford
 The Tempest, Ferdinand, dir. Richard Monette 
 The Lark, Brother Ladvenu, dir. Michael Lindsay-Hogg
 As You Like It, Silvius, dir. Antoni Cimolino
 Henry VIII, Surveyor, dir. Richard Monette
 Noises Off, Garry Lejeune, dir. Brian Bedford

Other Theatre Credits 
 L'école des femmes, Horace, Theatre francais de Toronto 
 Le dîner des cons, Juste Leblanc, Theatre francais de Toronto
 Grincements et autre bruits, Homme, Théâtre du Trillium 
 Don Juan, Pierrot, Théâtre du nouveau monde (Montréal)
 Unity 1918, Michael/Glen, Western Canada Theatre (Kamploops,B.C.) 		
 Menteur, Yannick, Théâtre la Seizième (Vancouver)
 An Evening with Beckett, Protagonist, Tandem Productions (Vancouver)
 Corpus Cristi, Peter, Hoarse Raven Theatre (Vancouver)

References

External links 
 
 Birmingham Conservatory for Classical Theatre
 

Canadian male film actors
Franco-Ontarian people
Living people
Canadian male stage actors
Canadian male television actors
Male actors from Toronto
Year of birth missing (living people)